Autódromo Parque Provincia del Neuquén is a  motorsports circuit located near Centenario, Neuquén, Argentina. The circuit was officially opened in 6 September 2009. The circuit has hosted Argentine national championships, such as Turismo Carretera and TC2000 Championship.

Lap records 

The official fastest race lap records at the Autódromo Parque Provincia del Neuquén are listed as:

References 

Autódromo Parque Provincia del Neuquén
Autódromo Parque Provincia del Neuquén